The 2020 Étoile de Bessèges was a road cycling stage race that took place between 5 and 9 February 2020. The race is rated as a 2.1 event as part of the 2020 UCI Europe Tour, and was the 50th edition of the Étoile de Bessèges cycling race.

Teams
Twenty teams were invited to the race. Of these teams, seven are UCI WorldTour teams, eight are UCI Professional Continental teams, and five are UCI Continental teams. While  entered six riders, every other team submitted seven. Of the 139 riders who started the race, 114 riders finished.

UCI WorldTeams

 
 
 
 
 
 
 

UCI Professional Continental Teams

 
 
 
 
 
 
 
 

UCI Continental Teams

Route

Stages

Stage 1
5 February 2020 – Bellegarde to Bellegarde,

Stage 2
6 February 2020 – Milhaud to Poulx,

Stage 3
7 February 2020 – Bessèges to Bessèges,

Stage 4

Stage 5
9 February 2020 – Alès to Alès, (ITT)

Classification leadership table

Classification standings

General classification

Points classification

Mountains classification

Young rider classification

Teams classification

References

External links
 

2020
2020 UCI Europe Tour
2020 in French sport
February 2020 sports events in France